is a Japanese voice actress. She is affiliated with Bell Production management. She is originally from Akita Prefecture. She sometimes uses  for stage performances.

Filmography

Anime series
 Coji-Coji (1997) – Coji-Coji
 Cosmic Baton Girl Comet-san (2001) – Raba-pyon, Kyoko Sensei
 Sonic X (2003) – Cream the Rabbit, Vanilla
 The World of Narue (2003) – Tomi Morino
 Lime-iro Senkitan (2003) – Kinu Fukushima, Theme Song Performance
 Wind: A Breath of Heart (2004) – Wakaba Fujimiya
 Shuffle! (2005) – Lisianthus
 The Melancholy of Haruhi Suzumiya (2006) – Kyon's sister
 Baccano (2007) – Miria Harvent 
 Shuffle! Memories (2007) – Lisianthus
 Da Capo II (2007) – Harimao, Minatsu Amakase,
 Ef: A Fairy Tale of the Two (2007) – Sumire Aso
 Nanatsuiro Drops (2007) – Yayoi Amenomori
 Da Capo II Second Season (2008) – Harimao
 Hell Girl (2009) – Suzumi Matsuda
 We Without Wings (2011) – Alice
 Humanity Has Declined (2012) – Fairy
 Da Capo III (2013) – Shiki Edogawa, Minatsu Amakase
 The Disappearance of Nagato Yuki-chan (2015) – Kyon's sister

Original video animation (OVA)
 Raimuiro Senkitan: The South Island Dream Romantic Adventure (2004) – Kinu Fukushima, Theme Song Performance
 Saishū Shiken Kujira (2008) – Sae Nagumo

Theatrical animation
The Disappearance of Haruhi Suzumiya (2010) – Kyon's sister

Original net animation (ONA)
 Saishū Shiken Kujira (2007) – Sae Nagumo

Video games
 Crescendo (2001) – Miyu Shizuhara
 Raimuiro Senkitan (2002) – Kinu Fukushima
 Wind -a breath of heart- (2002) – Wakaba Fujimiya
 Sonic the Hedgehog series (2003-Current) – Cream the Rabbit
Sonic Battle (2003)
Sonic Heroes (2003) 
Sonic Advance 3 (2004)
Shadow the Hedgehog (2005)
Sonic Riders (2006)
Sonic and the Secret Rings (2007)
Mario & Sonic at the Olympic Games (2007)
Sonic Riders: Zero Gravity (2008)
Mario & Sonic at the Olympic Winter Games (2009, Nintendo DS version)
Sonic Free Riders (2010)
Sonic Colors (2010, Nintendo DS version)
Sonic Generations (2011) 
Mario & Sonic at the London 2012 Olympic Games (2011)
 Summer Radish Vacation (2003) - Rina Inou
 Shuffle! (2004)  Lisianthus
 Summer Radish Vacation 2 (2004) - Rika Inou
 Super Robot Wars series (2004-Current) - Yoko Kuriki (Cookie)
Super Robot Wars GC (2004)
Super Robot Wars Operation Extend (2013)
 Nanatsuiro Drops Pure!! (2007) – Yayoi Amenomori
 Nettai Teikiatsu Shoujo (2007) – Tomoe Arashiyama
 Quilt (2007) – Kanami
 Summon Night: Twin Age (2007) – Ain 
 Suzunone Seven! (2010) – Sumire Daikanyama
 Sakura Momoko Gekijyo:Coji Coji – (xxxx)  Coji Coji
 Family Project (xxxx) – Wang Chunhua/Takayashiki Haruka
 Suigetsu (xxxx) – Maria Kosaka

Discography

 released on December 25, 2002, and ranked 131st in Oricon singles charts.
 image song album of the eponymous character released on May 28, 2003.

References

Maeda, Hisashi. "The Official Art of The Melancholy of Haruhi Suzumiya". (November 2007) Newtype USA. pp. 133–139.

External links
  
 Official agency profile 
 

Japanese voice actresses
1972 births
Living people
Voice actresses from Akita Prefecture